Owelu is a village in Imo State, southeastern Nigeria. It is located near the city of Umundula-orji.

Villages in Igboland
Towns in Imo State